Utsi is a surname of Sami origin. People with that name include:

 Inger Elin Utsi (born 1975), Sami politician and actor
 Nils Utsi (born 1943), Sami actor, stage director and film director.
 Per A. Utsi (born 1939), Sami politician

See also
 UTSI, University of Tennessee Space Institute

References

Sami-language surnames